Peripatopsis clavigera, the Knysna velvet worm, is a species of velvet worm in the Peripatopsidae family. This species has 16 pairs of legs and ranges from 4 mm to 17 mm in length. Peripatopsis clavigera is found in subtropical or tropical moist montane forests of the Diepwalle Nature Reserve in South Africa.

Conservation 

Peripatopsis clavigera is threatened by habitat loss. It is listed as Vulnerable on the IUCN Red List.

References

Further reading 
 

Animals described in 1899
Endemic fauna of South Africa
IUCN-assessed onychophorans
Onychophorans of temperate Africa
Onychophoran species